The 2017 Big East Conference men's soccer season was the fifth season for the newly realigned Big East Conference. Including the history of the original Big East Conference, this was the 22nd season of men's soccer under the "Big East Conference" name.

The regular season began on August 25, 2017 and concluded on November 1, 2017. Butler won the regular season title. The 2017 Big East Conference Men's Soccer Tournament to decide the Big East champion, and the conference's automatic berth to the 2017 NCAA Division I Men's Soccer Championship began on November 4, 2017 and concluded with the championship match on November 12, 2017. Georgetown defeated Xavier in the championship game, 2–1, on a golden goal by Declan McCabe.

Butler and Georgetown both qualified for the 2017 NCAA Division I Men's Soccer Tournament. Georgetown entered as an automatic berth, while Butler had an at-large berth. Georgetown was eliminated in the first round by SMU, while Butler reached the round of 16 before losing to Wake Forest.

Background

Changes from 2016

Head coaches

Preseason

Recruiting

Preseason poll 
The preseason poll was released on August 16.

Preseason All-Conference Teams 
All conference teams were announced in conjunction with the preseason poll on August 16, 2017.

Regular season

Rankings

United Soccer Coaches National

United Soccer Coaches Great Lakes Regional

Postseason

Big East Tournament

NCAA Tournament

Awards 

‡ unanimous selection

Draft picks

Notable non-draft signees 
The following are notable players who went pro following the end of the season that were not selected in the 2018 MLS SuperDraft.

See also 
 2017 NCAA Division I men's soccer season

Notes 
Mac Steeves won the 2016 Big East Preseason Offensive Player of the Year Award.Cory Brown won the 2016 Big East Preseason Defensive Player of the Year Award.J. T. Marcinkowski won the 2016 Big East Preseason Goalkeeper of the Year Award.There are 12 players selected for the Big East All-Preseason XI due to a tie in voting.Denotes a player that was unanimously selected for the preseason team.

References 

 
2017 NCAA Division I men's soccer season